Raffaele Stern (1774–1820) was an Italian architect.

Born in 1774 in Rome to Giovanni Stern, an architect. Raffaele was also the grandson of the Baroque painter, born and active in Rome, Ludovico Stern.

He was educated in Winckelmann's classical and neoclassical principles, and designed a plan for a New Wing of the Museo Chiaramonti in the Vatican Museums in 1805–1806, which he was commissioned to enact in 1817. He also worked on the papal restoration of the Colosseum and Arch of Titus which were later taken on by Giuseppe Valadier. He also built a new Fontana dei Dioscuri in 1818 for Pope Pius VII supporting an ancient Roman granite seashell (found in the 16th century) on top of a large basin. His pupils included Luigi Poletti.

Stern died in Rome in 1820.

Sources 
 www.italycyberguide.com

1774 births
1820 deaths
19th-century Italian architects
Architects from Rome
Italian neoclassical architects